This is a list of Fish that inhabit the Isle Royale National Park. If the name is in Bold it is non-native species.

Acipenseridae
Lake sturgeon, Acipenser fulvescens

Catostomidae
Longnose sucker, Catostomus catostomus
White sucker, Catostomus commersoni
Shorthead redhorse, Moxostoma macrolepidotum

Centrarchidae
Black crappie, Pomoxis nigromaculatus
Pumpkinseed, Lepomis gibbosus
Rock bass, Ambloplites rupestris
Smallmouth bass, Micropterus dolomieu

Clupeidae
Alewife, Alosa pseudoharengus

Cottidae
Fourhorn sculpin, Myoxocephalus quadricornis
Mottled sculpin, Cottus bairdii
Slimy sculpin, Cottus cognatus
Spoonhead sculpin, Cottus ricei

Cyprinidae
Lake chub, Couesius plumbeus
Creek chub, Semotilus atromaculatus
Longnose dace, Rhinichthys cataractae
Northern redbelly dace, Phoxinus eos
Finescale dace, Phoxinus neogaeus
Emerald shiner, Notropis atherinoides
Common shiner, Notropis cornutus
Blackchin shiner, Notropis heterodon
Blacknose shiner, Notropis heterolepis
Blacknose shiner, Notropis heterolepis regalis
Northern blacknose shiner, Notropis heterolepis heterolepis
Spottail shiner, Notropis hudsonius
Mimic shiner, Notropis volucellus
Golden shiner, Notemigonus crysoleucas
Eastern blacknose dace, Rhinichthys obtusus
Harvey lake pearl dace, Semotilus margarita koelzi
Minnesota pearl dace, Semotilus margarita nachtriebi
Blacknose dace, Rhinichthys atratulus
Harvey lake fathead minnow, Pimephales promelas harveyensis
Fathead minnow, Pimephales promelas promelas
Brassy minnow, Hybognathus hankinsoni
Allegheny pearl dace, Margariscus margarita

Esocidae
Northern pike, Esox lucius
Muskellunge, Esox masquinongy

Gasterosteidae
Ninespine stickleback, Pungitius pungitius
Brook stickleback, Culaea inconstans

Lotidae
Burbot, Lota lota

Osmeridae
Rainbow smelt, Osmerus mordax

Percidae
Logperch, Percina caprodes
Yellow perch, Perca flavescens
Ruffe, Gymnocephalus cernuus
Sauger, Sander canadense
Walleye, Sander vitreum
Iowa darter, Etheostoma exile
Johnny darter, Etheostoma nigrum

Percopsidae
Trout-perch, Percopsis omiscomaycus

Petromyzontidae
Sea lamprey, Petromyzon marinus
Northern brook lamprey, Ichthyomyzon fossor
Silver lamprey, Ichthyomyzon unicuspis

Salmonidae
Brook trout, Salvelinus fontinalis
Lake trout, Salvelinus namaycush namaycush
Siscowet, Salvelinus namaycush siscowet
Salmo oxyrinchus
Atlantic salmon, Salmo salar
Brown trout, Salmo trutta
Pygmy whitefish, Prosopium coulterii
Round whitefish, Prosopium cylindraceum
Pink salmon, Oncorhynchus gorbuscha
Coho salmon, Oncorhynchus kisutch
Rainbow trout, Oncorhynchus mykiss
Chinook salmon, Oncorhynchus tshawytscha
Cisco, Coregonus artedii
Lake herring, Coregonus artedii arcturus
Lake herring, Coregonus artedii sargenti
Siskiwit lake cisco, Coregonus bartlettii
Great lakes whitefish, Coregonus clupeaformis clupeaformis
Inland lakes whitefish, Coregonus clupeaformis neohantoniensis
Lake desor whitefish, Coregonus clupeaformis dustini
Big-eyed chub, Coregonus kiyi
Blackfin cisco, Coregonus nigripinnis
Shortnose cisco, Coregonus reighardi
Shortjaw cisco, Coregonus zenithicus

References

Fish of Isle Royale National Park
Isle Royale
.Isle Royale
.Isle Royale
Fish